Lophar miocaenus is an extinct bony fish  almost identical in form to the living bluefish, Pomatomus saltatrix, differing in its dentition, which consisted of "thick, conical subequal teeth" instead of the sharp, slender teeth and canines seen in bluefish.  L. miocaenus lived during the Upper Miocene subepoch of Southern California.

See also

 Prehistoric fish
 List of prehistoric bony fish

References

Miocene fish of North America
Pomatomidae